Soldiers and Sailors Memorial Hall and Museum (or often simply Soldiers and Sailors Memorial Hall) is a National Register of Historic Places landmark in Pittsburgh, Pennsylvania, United States.  It is the largest memorial in the United States dedicated solely to honoring all branches of military veterans and service personnel.

It was conceived by the Grand Army of the Republic in the 1890s as a way for Pittsburgh and Allegheny County to honor the dwindling ranks of its American Civil War veterans; it was built on what had served as the army mustering ground during the Civil War. The Memorial today represents all branches of the service and honors both career and citizen soldiers who have served the United States throughout its history.

Architect Henry Hornbostel designed the memorial in 1907. Dedicated in 1910, the building is in the Beaux-Arts style and is heroic in scale. It is located in the Oakland section of Pittsburgh at 4141 Fifth Avenue (although the walkway leading to its main entrance is signed as "Matthew Ridgway Blvd." in honor of the World War II and Korean War hero who called Pittsburgh home) and adjacent to the University of Pittsburgh campus and its Cathedral of Learning. The building is set back from Fifth Avenue, featuring expansive and well-kept lawns dotted with large cannons and other war implements. Side streets flanking the building are Bigelow Boulevard and University Place; directly behind is O'Hara Street.

The Memorial houses rare and one-of-a-kind exhibits that span the eras from the Civil War to the present day conflicts. Since 1963 it has operated the "Hall of Valor" to honor individual veterans from the region who went above and beyond the call of duty. Today the hall has over 600 honorees among them are Medal of Honor, The Kearny Cross, Distinguished Service Cross, Navy Cross, Air Force Cross, Silver Star and Distinguished Flying Cross winners.

The building houses an auditorium seating 2,500, a banquet hall, and meeting rooms, in addition to its museum. The expansive lawn of the memorial sits on top of an underground parking garage operated under a long-term lease by the University of Pittsburgh.

It has served as host for many city, civic, university, and business events including the April 25, 1978 Gulf Oil Corporation shareholders meeting.

Filming location
The 1991 film Silence of the Lambs used the hall to fill in for the "Memphis Courthouse" scenes, including the escape scene. All were filmed completely at Soldiers and Sailors.
Sorority Row had its graduation scenes filmed at the hall.
Dog Jack shot many scenes at the Memorial and hosted its premier in the Museum.

Famous visitors
Ferdinand Foch visited the hall in 1921.
Garner Ted Armstrong of The World Tomorrow spoke at The Soldiers and Sailors Memorial Hall on March 25, 1978.
G. E. Lowman spoke at the hall on April 23, 1938, and again in 1962
Nelson Mandela spoke at the hall on December 6, 1991.
Barack Obama visited the hall in 2008.
Donald Trump spoke at the hall on April 13, 2016.

Gallery

References

External links

SoldiersandSailorsHall.org official site
Carnegie Library's page on the memorial
NRHP nomination form
Allegheny County, Pennsylvania, in the war for the suppression of the rebellion, 1861-1865 : roll of honor, defenders of the flag, attack on Fort Sumter, S.C., April 12, 1861, surrender at Appomattox, Va., April 9, 1865 Lists the names of Civil war soldiers from Allegheny County

Video
 WQED onQ: Soldiers and Sailors Hall

Monuments and memorials on the National Register of Historic Places in Pennsylvania
Museums in Pittsburgh
Pennsylvania in the American Civil War
Beaux-Arts architecture in Pennsylvania
City of Pittsburgh historic designations
Pittsburgh History & Landmarks Foundation Historic Landmarks
Henry Hornbostel buildings
Monuments and memorials in Pittsburgh
American Civil War museums in Pennsylvania
Military and war museums in Pennsylvania
1910 establishments in Pennsylvania
Museums established in 1910
National Register of Historic Places in Pittsburgh
Individually listed contributing properties to historic districts on the National Register in Pennsylvania